The 2017 FIBA Asia Cup (formerly known as the FIBA Asia Championship) was the 29th continental basketball championship in Asia. The tournament was organised by FIBA Asia. It took place from 8 to 20 August 2017, a week earlier from the initial scheduled date, in Lebanon. The Nouhad Nawfal Arena with a capacity of 8,000 seats hosted the tournament's matches.

All 16 teams who qualified for the tournament also qualified for the first round of the FIBA Asia and FIBA Oceania qualifiers for the 2019 FIBA World Cup. The top five teams in the 2016 FIBA Asia Challenge earned an extra berth in the 2017 FIBA Asia Cup for their respective sub-zones. Australia and New Zealand participated for the first time in this tournament.

Australia won their first title by defeating Iran 79–56. South Korea finished third after beating New Zealand 80–71.

Qualification

One playoff berth each was allocated to the Central Asia, South Asia, Southeast Asia, and the Gulf subzones, while two berths were allocated to the West Asia subzone and three berths were allocated to the East Asia subzone. The top five teams of the 2016 FIBA Asia Challenge earned an extra berth for their subzones. Iran, Jordan, and Iraq earned three extra berths for the West Asia subzone, while South Korea and China earned two extra berths for the East Asia subzone. Australia and New Zealand from FIBA Oceania made their debut at the FIBA Asia Cup in 2017 as wild cards. Lebanon as the hosts clinched one of the five berths allocated to West Asia.

Format
The 2017 edition would have a different format as compared to what was used since 2009. While there would still be a preliminary round robin of four groups of four teams, the single-elimination final round immediately follows the preliminary round. In the final round, the teams that finished second and third in their respective groups would play in the qualifications to quarterfinals of the final round, while the group winners automatically qualify to the quarterfinals proper.

Draw
The official draw was held on May 30, 2017 at the Le Royal Hotel Dbayeh. At the time of the draw teams from East Asia and Central Asia have yet to secure their qualification for the 2017 FIBA Asia Cup. China, Hong Kong, South Korea, Chinese Taipei, Japan, and Kazakhstan, all of which later secured qualification, were part of the official draw.

Squads

Each team has a roster of twelve players. A team may opt to allocate a roster spot to a naturalized player.

Referees 
The following referees were selected for the tournament:

  Matthew Beattie
  Scott Paul Beker
  Wang Mei
  Yuen Chun Yip
  Ceciline Vincent
  Harja Jaladri
  Mohammad Doost
  Mohammadreza Salehian
  Ahmed Al Yaseen Al-Suwaili
  Toru Katayose
  Mohammad Fawzi Taha
  Alexey Stepanenko
  Yevgeniy Mikheyev
  Hwang In-tae
  Kim Jong-kuk
  Marwan Egho
  Rabah Noujaim
  Rabee Al Masri
  Matthew Ryan Bathurst
  Ryan Jones
  Ahmed Al Bulushi
  Ferdinand Pascual
  Ricor Buaron
  Hatim Alharbi
  Chuang Chih-Chun
  Chen Ying-Cheng

Preliminary round
All times are local (UTC+3)

Group A

Group B

Group C

Group D

Final round

Bracket

Classification 5th–8th

Playoffs

Quarterfinals

5th–8th place semifinals

Semifinals

Seventh place game

Fifth place game

Third place game

Final

Marketing

The official logo and mascot of the competition was unveiled on May 30, 2017. The logo was derived from the Lebanese flag described by designers as "flapping like the wings of the phoenix".  The red stripes of the logo forms an image of the ball with an image of the tournament cup in its center.

The official mascot of the competition is named Ox the Fox. Ox represents "great team spirit" and is characterized as quick, agile, and smart. These are three qualities which the designers of the mascot as essential for "any basketball player".

Final standing

Awards

 Most Valuable Player:  Hamed Haddadi
 All-Star Team:
 PG –  Shea Ili
 SG –  Mohammad Jamshidi
 SF –  Fadi El Khatib
 PF –  Oh Se-keun
 C  –  Hamed Haddadi

Statistical leaders

Players

Points

Rebounds

Assists

Steals

Blocks

Other statistical leaders

Teams

Points

Rebounds

Assists

Steals

Blocks

Other statistical leaders

Tournament game highs

References

External links
Official website

 
2017
2017–18 in Asian basketball
2017–18 in Lebanese basketball
August 2017 sports events in Asia
International basketball competitions hosted by Lebanon